The East Branch Brandywine Creek is a  tributary of Brandywine Creek in Chester County, Pennsylvania in the United States.

Course
The creek starts in Suplee near Honey Brook, and joins the West Branch Brandywine Creek in Lenape. From its source, the creek flows east, then southeast, passing through the borough of Downingtown.

Natural history

The East Brandywine is known for its fish. The game species are Rainbow trout, Brown trout, Brook trout, Smallmouth bass, Largemouth bass, Bluegill, Common carp. White Suckers and Creek Chub are also very common.

History
The East Brandywine served as a source of energy for hundreds of years. The waters also powered many factories in Downingtown.

Gibson's Covered Bridge crosses between East Bradford Township and West Bradford Township.

See also
 List of rivers of Pennsylvania

References

External links

 U.S. Geological Survey: PA stream gaging stations
 Photo of where the east branch of the Brandywine Creek rises

Rivers of Pennsylvania
Tributaries of the Christina River
Rivers of Chester County, Pennsylvania